Cambridgeshire Community Services Trust is an NHS trust that was established as part of the programme called Transforming Community Services under which a number of community health NHS trusts were established when these services were separated from primary care trusts.

Services
It runs:
Peterborough integrated sexual health services
Cambridgeshire community sexual health and contraceptive services
Luton drug services
Ely musculo-skeletal services

In 2022 it won a  £8.4 million contract to provide mental health support to 7,000 children in Norfolk and Waveney  schools for three years, taking over from Ormiston Families.  They also provide health visitors, school nurses and speech and language therapists in the area, and in Peterborough and Cambridge.

History 
The trust was established on 1 April 2010.

It was part of two consortium bids for an £800m older people’s service contract for Cambridgeshire and Peterborough Clinical Commissioning Group, first as part of a consortium with Capita and private health firm Circle, and then with Optum, formerly UnitedHealth UK, when Capita opted to withdraw from the process.

In April 2015 following the failure of these bids the trust transferred 1,360 staff to Cambridgeshire and Peterborough NHS Foundation Trust and 115 to various other providers.  It had, however, “won three multimillion pound contracts during 2014-15 to provide sexual health services in Norfolk and Suffolk, as well as the School Immunisation Programme across Cambridgeshire, Peterborough, Norfolk and Suffolk”.  Subsequently the contract collapsed, after just eight months.

It was named by the Health Service Journal as the best community trust to work for in 2015.  At that time it had 2864 full-time equivalent staff and a sickness absence rate of  4.89%. 83% of staff recommend it as a place for treatment and 73% recommended it as a place to work.

In 2019 the Care Quality Commission rated the trust outstanding and said it provided “excellent care and treatment, particularly in its community sexual health services”.

See also
 Healthcare in Cambridgeshire
 List of NHS trusts

References

External links 
 
 Care Quality Commission inspection reports

Community health NHS trusts
Health in Cambridgeshire